A Dutch auction is one of several similar types of auctions for buying or selling goods. Most commonly, it means an auction in which the auctioneer begins with a high asking price in the case of selling, and lowers it until some participant accepts the price, or it reaches a predetermined reserve price. This type of price auction is most commonly used for goods that are required to be sold quickly such as flowers, fresh produce, or tobacco. A Dutch auction has also been called a clock auction or open-outcry descending-price auction. This type of auction shows the advantage of speed since a sale never requires more than one bid. It is strategically similar to a first-price sealed-bid auction.

History 

Herodotus relates an account of a descending price auction in Babylon, suggesting that market mechanisms similar to Dutch auctions were used in ancient times. Descending-price auctions were used in 17th-century Holland for estate sales and paintings. The Dutch manner of auctioning appeared in England by the 17th century, which was called "mineing". In that type of auction, said to be a "Method of Sale not hitherto used in England", the auctioneer began with a high price that was sequentially reduced until one bidder cried out "Mine!" The Times mentioned one Dutch auction in 1788.

Auction process 
Before the auction commences, the auctioneer presents information about the objects sold to bidders. This information is displayed on a clock or electronic device in front of the site.

A Dutch auction initially offers an item at a price in excess of the amount the seller expects to receive. The price lowers in steps until a bidder accepts the current price. That bidder wins the auction and pays that price for the item. For example, a business might auction a used company car at a starting bid of €15,000. If nobody accepts the initial bid, the seller successively reduces the price in €1,000 increments. When the price reaches €10,000, a particular bidder—who feels that price is acceptable and that someone else might soon bid—quickly accepts the bid, and pays €10,000 for the car.

Dutch auctions are a competitive alternative to a traditional auction, in which customers make bids of increasing value until nobody is willing to bid higher.

Effect on stakeholders

Auctioneer's revenue 
The speed of the Dutch clock has a significant effect on final prices and the auctioneers revenue. A fast Dutch clock has been found to yield significantly lower bids and seller revenue when benchmarked against a First-price sealed-bid auction. On the contrary, a sufficiently slow Dutch clock is found to be more profitable than a First-price auction.  

Individual differences among bidders may also influence the degree to which a Dutch auction is profitable to the auctioneer. More advanced age has a clear, statistically significant adverse impact on the overall performance in Dutch auctions. Older bidders often end up paying too much in Dutch auctions because of their cognitive limitations and high need for closure.

In the case in which two or more bidders are participating in a Dutch auction, bid reductions should be increasing. Furthermore, the auctioneer's expected revenue should increase when the number of participants in the auction rises and number of bid levels increases.

The auctioneer is expected to increase its revenue when bidders exhibit the Allais paradox. This expectation is because bidders already have bidding preferences but insufficient time to change their preference and as such, typically act in accordance with their first plan.

Bidder's emotion 
In Dutch auctions, bidders are unable to view other participants' bids with the exception of the winning bid. This leads to participants experiencing greater uncertainty when assessing the competitive dynamics of the Dutch auction. When losing, participants experience a stronger emotional response compared to when winning the auction. This can be attributed to the instant-win feature of Dutch auctions. The winner is aware and assured of winning the auction and paying the winning price whilst losing comes abrupt and as a surprise for the remaining participants.

Bidders are more likely to experience winner regret, which occurs when winners believe they overpaid and loser regret, which occurs when losers believe they underbid when participating in Dutch auctions compared to other types of auctions. This can be attributed to Dutch auctions evoking a stronger emotional response as bidders are unable to seek signals that can inform their bidding behaviour such as other bids.

Public offerings 
Comparative to the standard book building method, Dutch auctions have also been considered for Public Offerings and price discovery. Dutch auctions have been praised as being more efficient and fairer as they can prevent underwriters from allocating stocks to known or favoured clients.  It has been suggested that improved efficiency in the IPO market is more likely to be felt in larger, already publicly listed companies as buyers are typically hedge funds or mutual funds. As such, the market has already priced their shares and an indication of issue size already exists.

The United States Department of the Treasury, through the Federal Reserve Bank of New York (FRBNY), raises funds for the U.S. Government using a Dutch auction. The FRBNY interacts with primary dealers, including large banks and broker-dealers who submit bids on behalf of themselves and their clients using the Trading Room Automated Processing System (TRAPS), and are generally told of winning bids within fifteen minutes.

For example, suppose the sponsor of the issuance seeks to raise $10 billion in ten-year notes with a 5.125% coupon and in aggregate the bids are as follows:

$1.00 billion at 5.115% (highest bid, lowest coupon)
$2.50 billion at 5.120%
$3.50 billion at 5.125%
$4.50 billion at 5.130%
$3.75 billion at 5.135%
$2.75 billion at 5.140%
$1.50 billion at 5.145% (lowest bid, highest coupon)
In this example the % at high is 66.66%, meaning only $3 billion of the $4.5 billion at 5.130% get bonds.  Bids are filled from the lowest yield (highest price) until the process raises the entire $10 billion. This auction clears at a yield of 5.130%, and all bidders receive the same yield. In theory, this feature of the Dutch auction leads to more aggressive bidding, as those who (in this example) bid 5.115% receive the bonds at the higher yield (lower price) of 5.130%.

A variation on the Dutch auction, OpenIPO, was developed by Bill Hambrecht and has been used for 19 IPOs in the US. Auctions have been used for hundreds of IPOs in more than two dozen countries, but have not been popular with issuers and thus were replaced by other methods.  One of the largest uniform price or "Dutch" auction IPOs was for Singapore Telecom in 1994.  The 1994 auction IPO of Japan Tobacco was substantially larger (with proceeds more than double those of Singapore Telecom and triple those of Google), but this auction was discriminatory or pay-what-you-bid, not uniform price or "Dutch". SRECTrade.com uses a two-sided Dutch auction to trade Solar Renewable Energy Credits (SRECs).

Dutch auction IPO’s have also been criticised for the possibility of tacit collusion and cartel-like behaviour as the issuer has discretion over price and allocation.  This possibility is more prevalent in primary market transactions.

Dutch auction share repurchases 
The introduction of the Dutch auction share repurchase in 1981 gives firms an alternative to the fixed price tender offer when executing a tender offer share repurchase. The first firm to use the Dutch auction was Todd Shipyards. A Dutch auction offer specifies a price range within which the shares are purchased. Shareholders can choose to tender their stock at any price within the stated range. The firm compiles these responses, creating a supply curve for the stock. The purchase price is the lowest price that allows the firm to buy the number of shares sought in the offer, and the firm pays that price to all investors who tendered at or below that price. If the number of shares tendered exceeds the number sought, the company purchases less than all shares tendered at or below the purchase price pro rata to all who tendered at or below the purchase price. If too few shares are tendered, then the firm either cancels the offer (provided it had been made conditional on a minimum acceptance), or it buys back all tendered shares at the maximum price.

eBay ascending uniform-price mechanism 
Rather than implementing a traditional Dutch auction, internet auction and e-commerce site, eBay, once utilised a multi-quantity listing style. This allowed a person to bid by specifying a price and quantity collectively. This Dutch auction mechanism has been referred to as ascending uniform-price “Dutch” auction

The units were sold per the price and quantity bidden which added up to the highest overall value. Each individual bidder ends up paying the price of the bidder with the lowest winning price. However, they all were guaranteed the quantity they demanded in their original bid. This has been criticised in literature as not being a Dutch auction as a Dutch auction does not guarantee price but rather, guarantees the quantity demanded by a bidder.

eBay’s Dutch auction application was discontinued on May 6, 2009.

Slow Dutch auction
Dutch flower auctions are considered to be a particularly fast auction form with particularly low transaction costs, and they use an electronic device to lower the price. Sometimes, slower processes such as the bargain basement of Filene's Department Store in the USA, during which the discount on goods was increased over time until the goods were sold, are considered Dutch auctions.
When faced with a positive cost of returning to the auction site, buyers prefer to purchase the object sooner (at a higher price) to economize on the cost of return. Therefore, when transaction costs are accounted for, Dutch auctions yield, on average, higher revenue than sealed-bid auctions. Holding electronic auctions reduces transaction costs substantially by relaxing physical and temporal constraints. In many cases, electronic markets enable competition in markets where competition was not possible before.

Dutch auction format

Dutch auctions are all sellers' bidding auctions, also known as silent auctions, which can be divided into two types.

 Manual silent auction: It is an early traditional form of price reduction auction, in which the auctioneer first publicly quotes the highest price, and then the bidders respond accordingly. In the event of a price that no one bids for, the auctioneer will decrease the price and quote a new price, and decrease the price one by one, and the process will continue until someone buys it; if there are more than two bids, the auctioneer should quote a new price in increments. price, that is, immediately transferred to the auction form, and the process of competitive price increase continued until no one added.
 Dial-type silent auction: It was also invented by the Dutch and is a modern form of reduced-price auction. That is to say, the auctioneer first announces the highest price in public, which is displayed on the corresponding scale on the electronic auction clock, and then the bidder presses the button to bid one by one. Indicates a decrementing price reduction until someone pushes a button to stall it for a purchase. When there are more than two bids, the hands of the auction clock will rotate clockwise, indicating that the price will be increased until the last person left to stop. Here, the electronic auction bell replaces the wooden auction hammer as the transaction tool.

See also 
 Auction rate security
 Bid-to-cover ratio
 Brazilian auction

Notes

References 
 
 
Li, Zhen; Kuo, Ching-Chung (May 2011). "Revenue-maximizing Dutch auctions with discrete bid levels". European Journal of Operational Research: S0377221711004875. doi:10.1016/j.ejor.2011.05.039.
Malekovic, Ninoslav; Goutas, Lazaros; Sutanto, Juliana; Galletta, Dennis (March 2020). "Regret under different auction designs: the case of English and Dutch auctions". Electronic Markets. 30 (1): 151–161. . .
Mishra, Debasis; Parkes, David C. (May 2009). "Multi-item Vickrey–Dutch auctions". Games and Economic Behavior. 66 (1): 326–347. .
Nakajima, Daisuke (September 2011). "First-price auctions, Dutch auctions, and buy-it-now prices with Allais paradox bidders: Auctions and prices with Allais bidders". Theoretical Economics. 6 (3): 473–498. doi:10.3982/TE502.

Types of auction
Economic history of the Netherlands
17th-century introductions
Dutch inventions